Peter John Cox (born 17 November 1955) is an English singer-songwriter, best known as the lead singer of the British pop duo Go West. As a solo artist, he scored three top 40 hits on the UK Singles Chart in the 1990s.

Early career and Go West
Peter John Cox sang in his school choir and later as a chorister at The Chapel Royal, Hampton Court Palace. In his early twenties, he worked in a covers band for The Mecca Organisation. In 1978, he joined Terra Nova, a band put together by former Manfred Mann's Earth Band members Chris Slade and Colin Pattenden; they released an album in 1980. While in residency in a Sheffield nightclub, Cox began writing with longtime collaborator Richard Drummie, with whom he eventually signed a publishing deal.

In 1982, Cox and Drummie formed the band Go West, with Cox as lead singer and Drummie on guitar and backing vocals. After Go West signed a deal with Chrysalis Records, "We Close Our Eyes" became a top 5 hit on the UK Singles Chart in 1985. Other Go West singles released that year included "Call Me" (1985) and "Don't Look Down". The following year, Go West was named 'Best Newcomer' at the 1986 BRIT Awards.

In 1987, the band reached the top 40 in the U.S. with the single "Don't Look Down – The Sequel". In 1990, Go West had a No. 8 hit in the U.S. with "King of Wishful Thinking" from the film Pretty Woman. In 1992, the duo released the Indian Summer album, which included "Faithful"; the song reached the top 20 in Canada and the United States.

Solo career
Cox moved to Los Angeles in 1993 to pursue a solo career. His self-titled debut album, Peter Cox, was released in 1997 to critical acclaim. Subsequent CDs include Flame Still Burns (2001), Nine Miles High (2002), Desert Blooms (2002), Game for Fools (2005) and Motor City Music (2006). Cox also teamed up with Tony Hadley on the album Tony Hadley vs Peter Cox & Go West, released in 2004.

In 2003, Cox replaced Then Jerico's Mark Shaw on the UK TV reality show Reborn in the USA after Shaw quit the series in the show's first few days. Even though Cox had achieved previous success across the Atlantic as the singer of Go West, he was able to appear on the show as he was unknown in the US as a solo artist. He was a favourite to win but was voted off in New York after he forgot the lyrics to the Norah Jones hit he was performing.

Other albums by Cox include The S1 Sessions, Riding the Blinds, and Damn the Brakes.

Cox's voice has been described as "smooth as silk" with a "gritty underbelly".

Discography

Solo albums
 1997: Peter Cox – Chrysalis – UK No. 64
 2001: Flame Still Burns (EP) – Blueprint Records
 2002: Nine Miles High (EP) – Blueprint Records
 2004: Desert Blooms – Blueprint Records
 2004: Tony Hadley vs Peter Cox & Go West – Blueprint Records
 2005: Game for Fools (EP) – Blueprint Recording Corporation Ltd
 2006: Motor City Music – Curb Records
 2010: The S1 Sessions – Blueprint Recording Corporation Ltd
 2012: Riding the Blinds – Blueprint Recording Corporation Ltd
 2013: Damn the Brakes – Blueprint Recording Corporation Ltd

Solo singles
"Ain't Gonna Cry Again" (1997) – UK No. 37
"If You Walk Away" (1997) – UK No. 24
"What a Fool Believes" (1998) – UK No. 39

References

External links
Official Peter Cox website
Official Go West website and forum
Unofficial Go West fan forum

Unofficial Go West fansite 'Go West Arena'
Hadley vs Cox 21 Jan 2004
BBC Berkshire Music – Tony Hadley and Peter Cox

English male singers
English songwriters
1955 births
Go West (band) members
Living people
English expatriates in the United States
Chrysalis Records artists
British male songwriters
Manfred Mann's Earth Band members